This is a list of placeholder names (words that can refer to things, persons, places, numbers and other concepts whose names are temporarily forgotten, irrelevant, or unknown in the context in which they are being discussed) in various languages.

Arabic
Arabic uses ,  ( / ) and when a last name is needed it becomes ,  ( / ). When a second person is needed,  ( / ) is used. The use of  has been borrowed into Spanish, Portuguese, Persian, Turkish and Malay, as shown below.

Assyrian Neo-Aramaic
Inna ܐܸܢܵܐ or hinna ܗܸܢܵܐ are used for “thingy”, “thingamabob”, etc. “Ayka dre-li inna?” roughly translates to “Where did I put the thingamabob?”

A verb of the root '-N-L (ܐܢܠ) likely derived from the noun is used to express actions similarly; for verbs that don’t immediately come to mind. Though not directly translatable into English, eg. “Si m’annil-leh” roughly translates to “go do that thing”.

Similarly to other Semitic languages, plān ܦܠܵܢ (masculine) and plānīthā ܦܠܵܢܝܼܬ݂ܵܐ (feminine) are used for “so-and-so”.

Bengali
Bengali uses the universal placeholder ইয়ে iay. Its generally placed for a noun which cannot be recalled by the speaker at the time of his/her speech. ইয়ে iay can be used for nouns, adjectives, and verbs (in conjunction with light verbs). অমুক omuk can also be a placeholder for people or objects. ফলনা/ফলানা folona/folana and its female equivalent ফলনি foloni is a placeholder specific to people. The phrase এ যে e je roughly translates to "you know" although the literal meaning is "this that". To refer to an extended family or generation the phrase চৌদ্দ গোষ্ঠী chouddo goshthi is used. It can also mean "everyone one knows", when used in a context of telling your "chouddo gosthi" something and not keeping a secret.

Bulgarian

A colloquial placeholder name for towns is the railway junction of Kaspichan, which often bears the connotation of a far-off forgotten place.

Cantonese
In Hong Kong, Chan Tai Man is commonly used as a placeholder. Chan was chosen because it is a common surname in the Hong Kong population. Tai Man is chosen because it has fewer strokes which makes it easy to write.

While English is also an official language in Hong Kong, Chris Wong is used as a common placeholder in Hong Kong English, particularly in school tests and examinations, e.g. HKDSE.

In legal proceedings, Mr/Miss/Mrs X / Y / Z could be used when the court decides to protect the victim's real identity, particularly in sexual criminal case.

Chinese

In Chinese, question words are used as placeholders.

The particle  often forms part of a placeholder. It occurs as a prefix of generic nouns (e.g.  "some person"), perhaps with an intervening measure word (e.g.  "a certain show"), or substituting people's actual names (e.g.  "Li Something").

Common placeholder names are:
 Zhang San
 Li Si
 Wang Wu
When more than three placeholders are needed, these are also occasionally used:
 Lu Er
 Zhao Liu
 Sun Qi
 Wang Ermazi
Zhang, Li, Wang, Zhao and Sun are among the most common Chinese surnames.

In all kinds of English exams in high school, Li Hua is often used as the character example in writing tests.

The expression  ("monkey year horse month") denotes an unknown but remote time in the future. For example,  is often translated as "to wait forever".

Czech

Things 

Persons 

Places 

The phrase  (literally, "where the foxes say goodnight") refers to a remote and isolated place, like "the middle of nowhere".

Danish

Things

'gear').

Persons

In common parlance and as a placeholder a variety can be used.  (Name Nameson) is an example.

When more than one a number is added, e.g.

Places
Faraway countries are often called , lit. Farawayistan.  was first used in 1959 in the weekly periodical  as Sonja Rindom's translation of Remotistan.

Backwards places in the countryside are called , lit. The fields of Lars Diarrhea.
Similarly , lit. Where the crows turn around may also be used for denoting both a far away and backwards place at the same time.

The expression  is a placeholder for a place far far away e.g. he kicked the ball .

Dutch

Things

"little thing" or "thingy") serves as a placeholder for objects when used with an article, and for persons without.

Persons

In 2010 the politician Geert Wilders introduced  as to describe the average Dutch couple. For some time, lower class young people were called .

 (literally 'Every-body' in old Dutch) is a character from a medieval play  (Everyman and Death). It is sometimes used to say any mortal.

Places

, a real village, is also used in this sense.

Numbers

It stems from the suffix used for double-digit numbers ( twenty,  forty), and is usually used in an aggravated context. ("I've tried that umpteen times already!").

Egyptian 
In Ancient Egypt, the names Hudjefa and Sedjes, literally meaning "erased" and "missing", were used by later Egyptian scribes in kings lists to refer to much older previous pharaohs whose names had by that time been lost.

English 
See Placeholder name.

Finnish

Things

This inflected word form is quite rare in everyday speech, which has resulted in its grammatical function being (mis)interpreted by native speakers as a grammatical particle instead of a verb. Analogously persons are  "whoever he may be", locations  "in wherever", etc.

 has the literal meanings "story", "criminal/court case", or "issue", but may refer to virtually anything inanimate.

Persons

In official contexts, the initials  (from the Latin , "name unknown") are used.

Pihtiputaan mummo ("the grandma from Pihtipudas") is the proverbial least knowledgeable and therefore least capable person to adapt to a new technology, such as the euro or digital TV.

Places

Actual locations in Finland that have acquired a similar status include  and, to some extent, though the latter is mostly associated with the proverbial "grandmother from Pihtipudas" explained above. They are usually spelled with a small initial letter when they are used as placeholder names.

Numbers

It has an intentional double meaning, as the word also means "billiards", and  also mean 1015.

Military usage

In Finnish military slang,  traditionally refers to a special type of socks worn during wintertime. However, it has become a common generic placeholder word outside the military, possibly due to its phonetic similarity to the aforementioned .

Any weapon, device or piece of equipment is called . This has actually pointed to the abbreviation VKT, Valtion Kivääritehdas (State Rifle Factory), and referred to light machine gun VKT23, which originally was called .

Time
Various other words evoking connotation with medieval or even pre-historic times can also be used in the expression.

French

Things

In French, an unspecified artifact can be:
  (n.m.); this is from military slang for something in disarray. It most probably comes from a dialectal word meaning "mud".
  (n.m.), derived from machine
  (n.m.), whose primary meaning is trick
  (n.f.), thing

 was a placeholder name in a 60s radio game show for a mystery object discovered by asking questions. It gained fame from a well-known sketch by Coluche and is now commonly used for any strange object. This was recast in English as the Smurfs.

In Brussels slang,  is either a heap of random small objects, or a nondescript object of little value.

In computer science research,  and  sometimes replace the English foo and bar as placeholder names for variables, functions and the likes.

Persons

Common placeholder names for people are
 In proceedings and other more formal settings: , ... (see XYZ Affair)
  or  designates anyone and everyone at the same time, in the third person, in an informal context. The very common  is used the same way as John Doe is in English.
  is the average homemaker or (when speaking about technology) a relatively unsophisticated user.
 , as an adjective, means 'average':  (the average driver),  (the average citizen).
  are the average extended family; they could also be a couple looking for a bargain, e.g. buying an apartment.
  (the widow from Carpentras, a city in southern France) is the archetypal absolute bear customer in stock exchange literature.
  are common characters in jokes.
  is also a commonly used name in jokes; when a female character is needed, it is feminized into . It is mainly used to evoke a young boy or a naïve person.
 (in Acadian French) which literally means boot with no laces-guy.

Places

In France:
  (small village)
  (genuine city name in Mali)
  (Neighbourhood east of Algiers)
  (genuine city name in Tunisia).

In French-speaking Belgium, Outsiplou or even  (Outsiplou-the-footbath) is a generic village of Wallonia. There is an actual but little known village near Liège named , whose name means "Listen whether it rains" in Walloon, and a hamlet named  in Belgian Luxemburg.

In Quebec:

Far away rural places:
 (Moukmouk Islands, some far away islands)

Numbers

Galician
A research in Galician language (and Spanish and Portuguese) classified the toponymic placeholders for faraway locations in four groups:
 related to blasphemies and bad words;
 related to religious topics;
 local (Galician) real toponyms (majorly , but also  or );
 international toponyms;
Some can add more than one element. It is also noted the prevalence of the adjective  ("fifth").

German

Things
German also sports a variety of placeholders; some, as in English, contain the element ,  (also  for towns), cognate with English thing. Also,  suggests a random heap of small items, e.g., an unsorted drawerful of memorabilia or souvenirs. (from ) may be used for any kind of machinery or technical equipment. In a slightly higher register,  represents a miscellaneous artifact or utensil, or, in casual German, may also refer to an item of remarkable size. The use of the word  (part) is a relatively recent placeholder in German that has gained great popularity since the late 1980s. Finally, as a placeholder, loosely corresponding to Latin , describes an event or a condition.

Persons

Uncle Fred).
 
For many years, Erika Mustermann has been used on the sample picture of German ID cards ("Personalausweis"). In Austria,  is used instead. Sometimes the term  is used as the last name placeholder, possibly because it is felt to be more politically correct gender-wise.

Places
"Little-Messy-Village"),   (lit. , which derives from usage in newspapers ("Mr. X from town Y. on the river Z."), is used occasionally. For remote and rural places there is also the term  (lit. "where fox and hare tell each other good night").

Numbers
For abstract large numbers the numeral suffix  (as in  = 20,  = 40,  = 60) is used like 'umpteen':  ('I already said so umpteen times'). Exponents of 10 are also used as in English.

Time 
An indefinite point in the future may be called  ("feast day of St. Never-Again")

Greek

There is also the name  used more jokingly. Unofficially, most placeholders are improvised, derived from pronouns, such as  "such",  "the from-such",  "the that" or  "the like-that". For locations,  "at the devil's mother" and  "to hell/to the place with no return" serve as a placeholder for a distant place.

For time, 30 or 31 February serves as a placeholder for events that will never happen.

Hawaiian Pidgin (English)

Hebrew

In Hebrew, the word  (meaning 'this') is a placeholder for any noun. The term  (meaning a protuberance, particularly the diacritical mark geresh), a borrowing of Russian  (a diminutive of   "forelock") is also used by some speakers.

The combined term  is also in modern official usage; for example, addressing guidelines by Israel postal authorities use  as the addressee.

(a typical Moroccan Jewish surname) is a somewhat derogative placeholder for a simple lower-class citizen, particularly of Mizrahi descent (that is, Jews of Middle Eastern or North African origin). The term Buzaglo test was coined in the 1970s by Aharon Barak, the Israeli Attorney General at the time, for the proposition that the law should apply with equal leniency (or severity) to a senior public official and to the simplest ordinary citizen.

Hungarian

In Hungarian the word  (a stem of ancient Uralic heritage) refers primarily to inanimate objects but sometimes also to people, places, concepts, or even adjectives. Hungarian is very hospitable to derivational processes and the  stem can be further extended to fit virtually any grammatical category, naturally forming a rich family of derivatives: e.g.  whatchamacallit (noun),  whatchamacallit-ish (adjective),  or  more whatchamacallit(ish) (comparative adjective),  in a whatchamacallitish manner (adverb),  to whatchamacallit something (transitive verb),  to cause someone to whatchamacallit (transitive verb),  to whatchamacallit continually (often meaning: pester, bother – frequentative verb). (In slang  and its verbal and nominal derivatives often take on sexual meanings). In addition to its placeholder function,  is an all-purpose hesitation word, like ah, er, um in English.

John Smith or Jake Gypsum, or Jakob Gipsch, with surname followed by given name, as normal in Hungarian). However these names are not used in official reports (for example instead of US John/Jane Doe  (unknown male/female) would appear in a police report). Jokes sometimes refer to an older person named  (a quite common male given name), especially if it is implied that he is perverted or has an unusual sexual orientation despite his age.

A general place reference is the phrase , meaning "behind the back of God", i.e. 'middle of nowhere'.

Icelandic

This and the other Nordic counterparts come from Donald Duck comic magazines, in which Donald tends to end up in that country if he doesn't play his cards right.

Indonesian
There is no single name that is widely accepted, but the name of Sukarno, Indonesia's first president, can be found in many articles; it has the advantages of being Javanese (about 45% of the Indonesian population), a single word (see Indonesian name), and well-known.

(this is Budi's mother) is a common phrase in primary school's standardized reading textbook from 1980s until it was removed in 2014.

 (the era when horses bite iron) and  indicates a very long time ago.

Irish

Things 
Common Irish placeholders for objects include  "that thing over there",  "that other thing", and  "whatever its name is".

Persons 
In Irish, the common male name  is part of the very old phrase  (Tadhg of the market-place) which combines features of the English phrases "average Joe" and "man on the street".

You've never seen a better Taig than with a bullet in his back" and "Don't be vague, kill a Taig".

By contrast, the term  remains a slur in almost every context. (from the name Bridget) is a female equivalent placeholder name for Irish females.

This has appeared in songs, an example of which is The Irish Rover in the words .

Italian

Things 

 (literally 'what's it called') is also used for inanimate objects, expecting to be prompted by the listener with the correct word.

 ("go and catch it"), was once very much used for rare or uncommon objects.  Now this term is quite obsolete.

Persons 
In the Venice area one can say  ("Peter the Lost") for an unknown person.

 is a generic placeholder for people, especially in examples where first name and family name should appear, like in credit cards advertising.  is formed coupling one of the most used male first names in Italy, with one of the most frequent family names.

Also, there are specific terms (from male names common in ancient Rome) for six unnamed people. They are always used in that order and with that priority; that is, one person is always ; two persons are always ; and three persons are always .

Places 

Numbers 

ICT usage
In information technology, especially in textbooks,

Japanese

In Japanese,  (a doubled form of the word , meaning 'what') is often used as a placeholder. It does not necessarily mean a physical object. For example, it is often used to stand in for an omitted word when discussing grammar. (no literal meaning) has been gaining popularity in the computing world, where it is used much like foo and bar. (literally "~~") is also a popular placeholder name.

On forms requiring a first and last name, the name  ( or ) is often used as a place holder.  was once an extremely common name for boys, but it has lost popularity significantly in recent years.  is still a common family name, literally meaning 'mountain rice field'. Occasionally  will be replaced with the name of the company who created the form, for example  for forms from Rakuten.

Kannada

Most police reports in Karnataka use this name. E.g., . ( is a gender-neutral way of addressing someone, similar to the English word 'person'.) Most of the articles/reports use gender, as they describe the state of location and conditions of the persons found, followed by skin-tone, height, age, birthmarks, and gender. , which translates to "respectable commoner", is another common term used to refer to a living person in general.

Korean

, the name of a legendary Korean outlaw, is commonly used as a placeholder name in instructions for filling out forms.  is another placeholder name, similar to John Doe.

Latin

In Latin the word  (thing) is used.

Formal writing in (especially older) Dutch uses almost as much Latin as the lawyer's English, and, for instance,  was and is commonly used as a "John Doe" placeholder in class schedules, grant proposals, etc.

Latvian

Names
In Latvian there is no universal placeholder name. Most entities tend to simply use popular real names, such as the male first name  (John) or the common surname  (Birch). As alternative "generalized" names, the male name  (Peter) and surname  (Hill) may be used. These are quite popular Latvian names and surnames and there are quite a number of real people bearing these names and surnames. See, for instance, the disambiguation page for Jānis Bērziņš in the Latvian Wikipedia.).
For female first names ,  and  may be used slightly more often than others.

Places
 is a universal placeholder for small town/village located away from civilization. As a contrast location – somewhat larger, still quite remote –  may be used. Literally these two are translated as "Smallfuck" and "Bigfuck". Also  may be used as a placeholder name for remote town.  ("God only knows where") may also be used.

Lojban 
However, Lojban speakers had begun to use them as placeholder words, especially in technical discussions on the language. To distinguish both uses, some special markers were created to unambiguously differentiate between anaphoric and metasyntactic usage.

Lithuanian

The names are often used in the examples of form filling. Also,  ("Name Lastname") is a common placeholder.

The name literally means "Farting village" in Lithuanian, although it actually originates with nearby lake , meaning "Bottomless" in Russian.

Malay

People
"Si fulan" and "fulanah" are classical Malay terms for anonymous or unknown people.

In modern Malay, "mat" and "minah" are used in slang for generic people.

Places
In Malay, the term "tempat jin bertendang" (the place where the jinn-spirits gather) is used for "the middle of nowhere". This is especially used in the Sarawak, Johor, and Kelantan dialects and nearby Indonesian.

In classical Malay literature, the expression "negeri berantah-antah" means "in a place that is unknown".

Norwegian

A placeholder name for the ordinary Norwegian is also  ("Everymanson").

Some also live in the larger  ("Big City").

A  is a small and sometimes useless object. (almost always plural), borrowed from German, is a random heap of small items.

Persian

A generic word that's used for calling anything, regardless of which type, is  "thing" (from the old Persian language).

Polish

Common nouns
"this" in nominative and genitive), which can also be used as a filled pause. For a semi-jocular term equivalent to "contraption" the Russian loan word  (Russian  "arrangement, mechanism") is often employed. Amongst young people sometimes  is used, literally meaning "all this", which is a phrase often used by comedian Wojciech "Major" Suchodolski.

Places
In press, to avoid details, journalists use the initial letter of a given name of a town, not especially the right one, with N. as predominant. "somewhere behind the cunt") which is an equivalent of English shithole. Sometimes, although rarely,  can also be used (almost always in a jocular sense), which has the same meaning as American English Dullsville, but is actually a little town in central Poland.

An unspecified place situated far from the speaker is called  ("over the mountains, over the forests"). "Goat's Wolka",  and  being frequent names of Polish villages). The typical place of a Polish joke is  – a small town in Świętokrzyskie in Eastern Poland.

The road leading to any place is sometimes called , after the popular Polish film . "into the cunt"). To say that something takes place in the whole country or is simply widespread, Polish native speakers employ phrases like  ("from the Hel to the Tatras"),  ("from the Baltic to the Tatras"), the equivalent of "Land's End to John o' Groats" or "from Orkney to Penzance" in UK English, or "coast to coast" in the USA.

Persons

Like in mathematics, the letter  is used – an imaginary person can be called . Mostly in the spoken language, one can hear the fictional name  (fem. ). Informally, to describe any unknown person, the phrase  (lit. "such a one") is in common use.

The military slang term for an unknown person is the acronym , standing for vulgar  (lit. "a cock knows him"). Other slang terms include  (lit.

Numbers

"mass", as in "a mass of errors"). "from a thunder"). For very big numbers one sometimes sees the term  (lit.

Also the phrase  ( +  +  +  = "one thousand" + "five hundred" + "one hundred" + "nine hundred") is often used for any large number (which value may not be known precisely).

For the approximate ending of an especially large number or an undefined decimal fraction of any number bigger than one, the expression  (lit. "with a hook" meaning "and something") is widespread; sometimes, not only in expressions related to money, one can say  (lit. "with Groschen"; compare English and change).

Among younger generations the number 2137 is used for any random number. It refers to the hour of the death of John Paul II.

Verbs
The verb  ( +  +  (action postfix) = "that" + "of this" + " do") can refer to any action. Various prefixes can be used to narrow down its meaning.

Portuguese

Things

In the 2000s,  ("thingy") has also been borrowed as slang into Brazilian Portuguese, mainly among the young. (lit. "beast") is used when the specific animal species is unknown, but also is a reference to any living thing whose name does not come to mind or is not of interest.

Persons

It is also used between friends to call each other (equivalent to "Hey, you!").

Places

For faraway places, the term  is employed both in Brazil and Portugal, and, despite being an actual place, is used in a generic way as a placeholder for somewhere far away.

Numbers

 and  when used with another word means "something". For example,   means "thirty-something euros", while   means "thirty-something reais". It can also be used for years:   means "In nineteen-eighty-something".

Another informal Brazilian placeholder name for numbers, particularly those considered big, either as superlative or in quantities really grueling to count manually, is  e.g. , which roughly translates as "That clueless wealthy girl, I can not imagine how many  of shoes and dresses she owns".  is a jocular way of saying  (three hundred).

Actions

Quechua
In Quechua, there is a noun radical  (whatever) to which verbal ( = to do whatever), agentive ( = the doer of whatever), or affective ( = cute little thing) suffixes may be added.

Romanian

In Romanian, 
 is used for objects and concepts,
 for both persons and things.
, the most common Romanian name is used as an equivalent of John Doe or as a sample name for common paperwork. In a more jocular manner, but still part of colloquially understood Romanian, is combining the word  with the ending of Romania's most common names, creating the word 
 ("devilish thing") is a derogative placeholder name for objects (but the derogative nuance is not diabolical, it may simply suggest unfamiliarity or surprise, rather like the adjective "newfangled" in English). "what the devil's devilish [thing]?", similar to "what the hell").
 is used to designate any kind of (thick) paste or mix. It can indicate construction materials, creams, foods, ointments etc.

Other expressions used include 
 /  ("what's-it-called"),
 ("I-don't-know-how/what/which/who/when"),
 ("who-knows-what/how/which/who/when"), and

Diverse colloquial formulas for "a lot" exist, including  (lit. "a cart-full"),  (lit. "a pile"),  (vulgar; it doesn't mean anything other than "(really) lots of (smth.)"; it sounds both scatological and augumentative in Romanian; comparable with "shit-load") or the poetic  (lit. "as many leaves and blades of grass", referring to a large number of people).

"at the devil's mother"),  (where the devil weaned his children) also mean a very remote place. Other place names may be used as generic placeholders, depending on the speaker's origins.

Russian

Universal
A large number of placeholder words for people, things, and actions are derived from Russian profanity (mat), as may be found in multiple dictionaries of Russian slang.

Things

Persons

The word entered into a common parlance as well.

Words like  (guy),  (comrade),  (wanderer or rather bum),  (working man),  (dude), / (friend masc./fem.),  (young man),  (young woman),  (citizen),  (respected one),  (dear) all have their own meaning but may be and are used as second-person placeholders as well.  is most commonly used by migrant workers from southern FSU countries addressing Russians.

 (seventh water on kissel) denotes very far relatives.

 is a derogative placeholder for guest-workers from southern FSU countries.

Places
"at the devil's allotment"), which is roughly equal to English "at the world's end" and "in the back of beyond".
Various city names are often employed as placeholders. For instance, to denote a remote, obscure place:
  (Tmutarakan, an ancient Crimean city which sounds in modern Russian something like "dark cockroach city", тьма таракан)
  (Zazhopinsk, "city beyond the ass")
  (Mukhosransk, "fly shit city"). 
  ("Where Makar didn't drive the calves"), meaning  "far-far away" or "somewhere you won't like".
Latin N is sometimes used as a placeholder for the actual name of the site, e.g.  ("city N").

Serbian

Things
 used for mechanical devices of unknown purpose.
 (pl.), used for small objects.

Persons
 or the shorter version  are used as a John Doe placeholder name
 (pl.), addressing to Serbs or other "Yugoslav" (members of ex-Yugoslavian ethnic groups)
 used colloquially for an unknown very distant and obscure relative, i.e. a progenitor of a large family.

Places
 is used to represent far and unknown country.

Slovak

Things

Persons
"Joe Little Carrot"). This term is used mostly by young people.

Places
"Upper Lower", a reference to common village names of form "Upper Something" / "Lower Something". It is often used in derogatory fashion to indicate a tiny and remote village (compare US English Hicksville).

In fairy tales,  ("over the seven mountains") is commonly used for an unfamiliar faraway place.

Slovene

In Slovenia the name  is used in place of John Doe, for legal matters.  is also commonly used.

For a remote place,  is often used.

Spanish-speaking cultures

Time
Indefinite time in the past:
, "when Charles reigned". The origin is unclear, the most viable hypothesis is that it refers to Charles III of Spain: on a frontispiece of a gate in Alcalá de Henares in the Community of Madrid there used to be an inscription . While the king ruled in 18th century, the romanization of the text gave an impression of antiquity.

Spanish (Europe)

Things
 is generally used for objects and/or devices around the kitchen.  can be used for any object whose name is unknown or doesn't come to mind, much like English thingy.

 (from Latin  ~ ), a pejorative term, is used for an animal of unknown species and also for bugs; in Puerto Rico it also means 'penis'.

Persons
Placeholder names in the Spanish language might have a pejorative or derogatory feeling to them, depending on the context.
The fool in question was a jester with a drum who accompanied a town crier, with the latter collecting salary and tips for both of them, and taking lion's share Hence the indignation implied in the phrases, such as "Who do you think I am, a fool with sticks?".  was one of numerous pseudonyms of Manuel Gutiérrez Nájera.
(feminine)  ("Rita the Singer") in reference to a woman who would do something one doesn't want to do oneself: . Rita de Cantaora was actually Rita Giménez García, see her article about the origin of the expression.
 (from Arabic ) is the default placeholder name for a human (the female version  should be used carefully as it is also slang for "prostitute", but the diminutive form  is safe).  is the equivalent of John Doe.  is cognate with the Biblical Hebrew term  (see above).
  (from the Arabic ).
 (from the Castilian word  from the Latin  "known").
 (from the combination of the very common last name of Perez and Mengano).
When several placeholders are needed together, they are used in the above order, e.g. .

It is also used between friends to call each other (equivalent to "dude").

Places
  (lit. E.g.:  ("We got lost and ended up in the fifth pine") 
  (or ) is, according to the Real Academia, a colloquial "distant or imprecise place". Also used with the intensifier  ("faraway"), thus  ("in faraway Chimbamba-land" or "in faraway Chimbambistan"). 
  ("in the ass end of the world") doesn't have the same meaning as in English. It is only mildly derogatory, and its primary meaning is the same as "back of nowhere".
  is a phrase that originally meant ("[go] take it up the ass"), but has been lexicalised into meaning "go to hell", "send something or someone to hell" or "forget about it", as documented in the dictionary of the Real Academia.

Numbers

Spanish (Latin America)
, thus turning "thirty and change" into  is used in Mexican Spanish.

 is commonly used only among Central and South American Spanish speakers when referring to an unknown and/or unpleasant place, hence  (go to el carajo) may translate as "go to hell" or "get lost".

Also,  is considered an insult when used unproperly. The word  (from ) is used to refer to unspecified actions or objects.

 is word commonly used by Dominicans and Venezuelans to refer to any object; its usage is similar to "thingy" or "stuff". It can be a very crude word elsewhere in the Caribbean.

People
 (or its diminutive) is common in Argentina, Chile, Colombia, Peru and Ecuador.

Places
In Uruguay, Argentina, Ecuador and Colombia,  (an old name for southern Vietnam; see Cochinchina campaign) means a remote and perhaps nonexistent place.  Combined with  it means 'everywhere' in the phrase .

In Chile,  is used for a remote place.

Central America 
In parts of Central America (e.g. El Salvador and Costa Rica) the word  is used for any object.

Argentinian Spanish

Things
 or its diminutive  (thing) is used for a generic physical object, usually replacing a noun when the speaker does not remember its name (i.e. , Hand me that thingie on the table). Also  (trinket, tchotchke),  (small object).  (what's-it-called) is also used.

: cheap bric-a-brac or jewellery.

: any animal colloquially.

Numbers
 ('at 1500'): very late.

 ('forty-fifteen'): jocularly, an indeterminate number.

: a lot, a zillion.

People
: So-and-so.
Un : just some guy, nobody important.
,  (Not Named), used in police reports, famously used for unidentified bodies found during the Dirty War.  is a more recent application of the acronym.
: magician with supernatural powers. : Not even Mandrake can fix it, usu. applied to an economic conundrum.  , I'm not Mandrake, meaning: Explain yourself, I can't read your mind.
 (pubic hair) means a small child or somebody very young; note that this word has a completely different meaning in Mexico.
 (Jimmy) is often the smart-mouthed kid who is the main character in Little Johnny jokes.
For respected elders,  or  can be used without a name to refer to someone treated as important.
 may be used more or less interchangeably as terms of endearment.

Places
 ('tomato/ass/shit/fuck hill') is a vulgar phrase for a very remote place.

 ("the parrot's cunt"): an unspecified, possibly remote place, usually used in the insult "Go to ...".

 ('where the devil lost his poncho'): in a remote place, at the back of beyond.

Time
: literally, when pigs fly.

: donkey's years.

: goalkeeper's day (never).

Ecuadorian Spanish

Things

People

For small children or young people, Ecuadorians normally use to call children  (a more vague form of the also used ).

 (faggot) is used to call the attention of someone you know, but it can also be used in a derogatory tone. They all are variations on the dude theme.

 ('boss') is also popular when addressing an unknown middle-aged man.

For respected elders,  or  can be used without a name.

Places

: (Lit. The house of the cock), sometimes used like ,  is an insult, while  colloquially means I was wasted or otherwise ruined.

Colombian Spanish

Things
For a generic thing  is used for things not well known, but it indicates anger or loss of temper.  ('what's it called') is also used.

People
 is the generic man,  being a common surname.

Colombians call small children  ("Chinese"),  (a more vague form of the also used ),  (sardine, i.e. little fish).

 (Johnny) is a small boy of school age; in jokes,  is often the smart-mouth kid who is the center of the joke.  (Joey/Josie) is also often used in the context of jokes.

 (faggot) is a placeholder name popular in the Caribbean Region, although it is derogatory.  is often used in the north and not as an insult, but more in the context 'dude' would be used, and people do not respond angrily at this, as it is believed that if you do get mad, it is because you are in fact gay.

For respected elders,  or  can be used without a name;  is used similarly.

Places
 ("shit hill") is a vulgar name in Argentina for a very remote place; similarly  ("anus hill").

Swedish

Things

(or, more slangy) more specifically refers to a complex appliance of some kind, much like the German . (that and that) corresponds to so and so.  may refer to any fairly large quantity of unwanted substance or objects of varied or indeterminate identity, much like the English "junk".

Persons

The closest Swedish equivalent of John Doe in Swedish is the formal  (Latin , "name unknown").

Common first names infrequently used as placeholders are "Kalle" for boys and "Lisa" for girls.

More in use is the equivalent of the collective term Average Joe: .  is Swedish for 'medium' or 'average', and Svensson is a common Swedish surname.

"Tolvan Tolvansson" is a fictitious person who is used in Swedish health care for educational purpose with personal identity number 121212+1212.

Swedish journalists also have an equivalent for John Doe when referring to the average reader: "Nisse i Hökarängen."

In more formal text the abbreviation  (for Latin , "name unknown") is sometimes used.

Places

Numbers

Tagalog

The Cebuano loanword / may also be used.

"Juan dela Cruz", or simply "Juan", is both a national personification as well as representative of the Filipino everyman whose name as is used as a placeholder name. The negative  is a more colloquial term for people the speaker considers to be a malefactor or treacherous.

As in referring to objects, the Cebuano word  may also be used.

As to time,  and "nineteen-forgotten" are playfully derisive terms for anything whose exact year of origin is forgotten, similar to the more "ancient"  ("time (before) the Japanese") and the even older  ("the time of Methuselah/[Prophet] Muhammad)".  (literally "nine-nine") is derisively used for the unknown end of a particularly long time period spent doing something, e.g.,  ("It will take you ages at that pace you're going!").

Turkish

Placeholders for persons exist in abundance, one example being  ("Mehmet Ağa with yellow boots") which generally is used to mean pejoratively "unknown person".

 meaning "thing" is used colloquially for an object or an action the person has that second forgotten.  (literally "He said 'thing',...") can be used instead of "He said that...". It can also be used as a euphemism in place of a verb;  ("I didn't want to 'thing'") can mean "I didn't want to make an issue out of it."

Ukrainian
Ukrainian has its own placeholders.

Alternatively, the Latin letter N is for something or someone that is anonymous.

People
For people, commonly-used names and surnames are used to represent generic people, such as Mykola, Volodymyr, Oleksandr, and Ivan for given names, and Melnyk, Shevchenko, Kovalenko, and Tkachenko. The given and family names are often mixed up to make the subject more random.

"постражда́лий" ("victim") and "невідомий" ("unknown") are also commonly used for generic people.

Places
In Ukrainian, random places within Ukraine are used to represent a generic location.

The words звідкілясь ("somewhere"), хтозна-звідки ("who knows where"), чортзна-де ("wherever the hell is that") are specifically used for places the speaker doesn't know.

Objects
я́к його́ (там) refers to something the speaker doesn't know.

Vietnamese
Nguyễn Văn A (male) or Nguyễn Thị A (female) can be used similar to John and Jane Doe. For more placeholder names, subsequent letters in the alphabet (Nguyễn Văn B/Nguyễn Thị B, Nguyễn Văn C/Nguyễn Thị C, etc.) or different family names can be used (Lê Văn A/Lê Thị A, Trần Văn A/Trần Thị A, etc.)

Welsh
Welsh uses  (or the respectful ), literally "what you call", meaning whatchamacallit.
Pwyna is used for persons whose name cannot immediately be recalled.

Yiddish

Comic David Steinberg did a routine about his attempt to identify an object, based only on his father's description of it as "In Yiddish, we used to call it ."

References

Lists of names
Placeholder names